Crystal Lake is a lake in Broward County, Florida.  In September 1999 the area was annexed by the City of Deerfield Beach.

See also 
 List of lakes in the United States

References

External links

Lakes of Florida
Lakes of Broward County, Florida